National Seminary of Our Lady of Lanka is a Roman Catholic Seminary situated in Ampitiya, Kandy, Sri Lanka. It was established in 1955 from the Papal Seminary buildings after the Papal Seminary was transferred from Kandy to Pune, India. Many priests even from the Archdiocese of Colombo serve here.

The National Seminary was entrusted to the Oblates of Mary Immaculate who were already instructing priests at St. Bernard's Seminary, Colombo. The first academic year of the National Seminary of Our Lady of Lanka commenced on 10 September 1955.

Background

In 1890, as per the request of Pope Leo XIII, Monsignor Ladislaus Zaleski started exploring the possibility of a Papal Seminary for India, Burma and Ceylon. Zaleski took up residence in Kandy, and chose an upland known as Ampitiya, that overlooks the Dumbara Valley. The Papal Seminary was established in 1893. It was one of the first major seminaries to be supported by the Pontifical Society of St. Peter the Apostle.

Establishment

After the Papal Seminary was moved to Pune, India, the former buildings became the home to the National Seminary of Our Lady of Lanka in 1955. The administration was entrusted to the Oblates of Mary Immaculate who were already instructing priests at St. Bernard's Seminary, Colombo. The first academic year of the National Seminary of Our Lady of Lanka commenced on 10 September 1955.

References

External links 
 History of National Seminary Sri Lanka (2017 archive)

1955 establishments in Ceylon
Seminaries and theological colleges in Sri Lanka
Schools in Kandy